The following is a list of unproduced John Hughes projects in roughly chronological order.  During his long career, American film director John Hughes has worked on a number of projects which never progressed beyond the pre-production stage under his direction.  Some of these productions fell in development hell or were cancelled.

1970s

National Lampoon's Jaws 3: People 0
In 1979, Matty Simmons hired Hughes and Tod Carroll to write the script of the third Jaws film as a National Lampoon parody from Universal Pictures.  According to Simmons, the film was to star Bo Derek and Richard Dreyfuss and be directed by Joe Dante.  Rodger Bumpass was also to appear in the film.  However, Steven Spielberg, who directed the first film, managed to convince Universal not to make the film by threatening to never work with the studio again.  Nevertheless, Simmons credits the unmade film as to how Hughes began his career in the film industry.

1980s

Motorheads Vs. Sportos, aka Just Like Romeo And Juliet, aka Suburban Westside Story

A comedy/romance scripted by Hughes for Paramount Pictures in 1982. A reworking of Romeo and Juliet set in a Chicago high school about a romance that happens in the division between two feuding groups, the Motorheads and the Sportos. The idea later emerged in a speech by Edie McClurg in Ferris Bueller's Day Off.

The History of Ohio from the Beginning of Time to the End of the Universe
In the early 1980s, Hughes and P. J. O'Rourke scripted an unproduced adaptation of National Lampoon Sunday Newspaper Parody which they titled The History of Ohio from the Beginning of Time to the End of the Universe.  According to O'Rourke, "We never really got it to work and finally abandoned it.  But it was fun to work together."

The New Kid
During the 1980s, Hughes wrote a script titled The New Kid, and it was based on his experiences growing up.  According to Kirk Honeycutt, the story was "about a teenager's experiences in a new high school in Arizona".  When Hughes offered Howard Deutch the choice to direct either The New Kid or Pretty in Pink (1986), Deutch chose to direct the latter film.

The Last Good Year
Anthony Michael Hall claims that during the making of The Breakfast Club (1985), Hughes had an idea for a movie which he titled The Last Good Year: "At one point when we were doing The Breakfast Club, John had an idea for a movie called The Last Good Year. It was something that he pitched to me as something he wanted to do with me, about the last good year being 1962, before the Beatles’ invasion. Maybe it was a sarcastic title. The idea was, I think, that the cultural shift was significant to him—the crossover in time from Pat Boone America to Beatles America. He didn't have too many of the story elements worked out, but, man, did he have a mix tape put together."

Lovecats
Molly Ringwald claims that after he finished The Breakfast Club, Hughes had written a script based on The Cure song, "The Lovecats".

Oil and Vinegar

After he finished Pretty in Pink, Hughes wrote the script of a film titled Oil and Vinegar, which was to star Matthew Broderick and Molly Ringwald.  According to Inquisitr, Broderick and Ringwald were to portray a couple who "spend a day in a motel room, swapping stories on life and love".  According to Broderick, "It was very intimate: it was just the two of them, basically, is my memory, often in a car.  It was a very typical romantic comedy about two very different people who fell in love, but it was very inventive in its smallness."

The film was to have been  released by Universal Pictures, but Hughes objected when the studio asked for rewrites.  Therefore, the creative differences between Hughes and Universal, along with Broderick and Ringwald's scheduling conflicts, are credited for why the film was never made.

1990s

Bartholomew vs. Neff
In 1990, it was reported that Hughes would direct Sylvester Stallone and John Candy in a comedy he had written titled Bartholomew vs. Neff for Carolco Pictures.  The film was to have been about feuding neighbors.  Hughes had planned to direct the film right after he finished Curly Sue (1991).  According to the Los Angeles Times, principal photography was scheduled to take place in the suburbs of Chicago during the summer of 1991.  The film was never made.

Black Cat Bone: The Return of Huckleberry Finn
In 1991, it was reported that Hughes would write, produce and direct Black Cat Bone: The Return of Huckleberry Finn for 20th Century Fox.  It was to have been about the character that was created by Mark Twain but be set in modern times.  Principal photography for that film was scheduled to begin on March 16, 1992.  However, it was reported that Hughes was competing against TriStar Pictures and Walt Disney Pictures, since both studios were also trying to make a Huckleberry Finn movie.  Disney eventually succeeded over Fox and TriStar following the completion of The Adventures of Huck Finn (1993).

Peanuts
After four consecutive Hand-Drawn Animated movies made by Cinema Center Films and Paramount Pictures respectively, in 1992, it was reported that Hughes would write and produce a live action adaptation of Charles M. Schulz's Peanuts for Warner Bros.  Hughes reportedly visited Schulz at his home in Santa Clara, California to talk about adapting Peanuts into a film.  According to Variety, Hughes planned to start writing the script on Christmas of 1992 and finish it by the spring of 1993; Hughes also did not verify that he would direct the film.  It is believed that the critical failure of Dennis the Menace (1993), which Hughes wrote and produced for WB, is what prevented the movie from being made. The CGI film was finally released in 2015 by Blue Sky Studios and 20th Century Fox Animation now owned by Disney.

The Pajama Game
Variety reported in 1992 that Hughes and Warner Bros. were to do a remake of the 1957 film The Pajama Game.

Damn Yankees
In 1993, Hughes reportedly wrote a script adapted from the musical Damn Yankees, but it never came to fruition.

The Bee
Due to the commercial success of Home Alone (1990), Hughes felt determined to make The Bee, a live action family comedy film that he wrote that required a $50 million budget.  According to Daniel Stern, The Bee is about "an architect who was trying to finish his project that day and a bee comes into the house and the guy gets distracted by the bee. And the entire movie is the bee forcing the guy to destroy his own house and take his life apart."  Kirk Honeycutt claims that The Bee was inspired by Hughes' "involvement in the development of Redwing Farms, where he worked to reforest the land and turn it into a proper English farm."  It is said that of Hughes' script, only ten pages of it contained dialogue.

The Bee was initially developed at 20th Century Fox, but by early 1993, Hughes sold the project to Warner Bros. after Fox passed on it.  Then in May 1994, WB put the project in turnaround.  By June that same year, it was officially announced that Hughes would write, produce and direct The Bee for Walt Disney Pictures with a budget of $25 million. Simon Brew credits Hughes's 1994 departure from Hollywood, along with the critical and financial failure of Baby's Day Out (1994), which he wrote and produced for Fox, as factors that led to the film's cancellation.

In later reports, Daniel Stern claimed that he was going to direct the film.  According to Stern, Hughes visited him on the set of Home Alone 2: Lost in New York (1992), showed him the script of The Bee and asked him to direct it.  Stern further claimed that he worked on the script with Hughes.  It has also been reported that Steve Martin was considered to star in the film.

In 2022, Netflix announced a short-form comedy streaming television series titled Man vs. Bee starring and co-written by Rowan Atkinson based on a similar concept to Hughes's The Bee.

Dumb and Dumber 
According to Kirk Honeycutt, Hughes originated the story, wrote an incomplete initial draft, eventually abandoned it, sold it to the Farrelly brothers and had his name removed.

Tickets
In 1996, Hughes had written a script titled Tickets.  According to Bradford Evans, "Tickets was a script that followed a group of teenage strangers camped out all night in zero degree weather for tickets to their favorite band’s farewell show."  The script was never made into a film due to the release of the similarly themed film Detroit Rock City (1999).

2000s

The Grigsbys Go Broke
In 2002, Hughes had written a script titled The Grigsbys Go Broke, which was about a wealthy family in Chicago who lose all of their money and are forced to move to the other side of the tracks.  It was later reported in 2010 that Paramount Pictures bought the rights to the script.  However, the studio officially confirmed that it was not negotiated to purchase the script. The Grigsbys Go Broke (Former Version of Dear Lemon Lima)

The Perks of Being a Wallflower
There was an online rumor that at one point, Hughes was going to write and direct an adaptation of the 1999 novel by Stephen Chbosky. It was said that Shia LaBeouf, Kirsten Dunst and Patrick Fugit were set to play Charlie, Sam and Patrick respectively. The film was also said to have a dark comedic tone. However, Hughes never completed a screenplay before his death nor it was confirmed that he was at one point making it before his death. The novel however was adapted and released in 2012 with Logan Lerman, Emma Watson and Ezra Miller playing the roles of Charlie, Sam and Patrick. The film was written and directed by the novel's author, Stephen Chbosky.

References

Hughes, John